Limetown is a scripted fiction podcast fiction series created by Two-Up Productions that debuted on July 29, 2015, and became the number one US podcast on iTunes less than two months later. The show has drawn comparisons to the popular podcast Serial and the 1990s television show The X-Files. The series was written and directed by Zack Akers and produced by Skip Bronkie. The second season debuted on October 30, 2018.

Awards

Plot 

Limetown is a fictional story told as a series of investigative reports by Lia Haddock (played by Annie-Sage Whitehurst), a journalist for American Public Radio (APR), detailing the disappearance of over 300 people at a neuroscience research facility called Limetown, in Tennessee.

Episode listing 

Although the creators planned seven episodes for the first season, only six were produced: Very short teasers were broadcast after some episodes.

Other media

Prequel book
Two-Up Productions signed a book deal with Simon & Schuster to produce a prequel of Limetown in novel form. It was written by Cote Smith and released on November 13, 2018.

TV series

On October 8, 2018, it was announced that Jessica Biel would star as Lia Haddock for a Limetown TV series, to air on Facebook Watch. Stanley Tucci was cast as Emile Haddock. The first season run of 10 episodes premiered October 16, 2019. The series was cancelled by Facebook Watch after its inaugural season. It is now available on the NBCUniversal streaming service Peacock.

See also
 List of podcast adaptations

References

External links

2015 podcast debuts
Audio podcasts
Fictional populated places in Tennessee
Science fiction podcasts
Podcasts adapted for other media
2018 podcast endings
American podcasts
Scripted podcasts